Nikolai Vladimirovich Drozdetsky (14 June 1957 – 25 November 1995) was a Russian ice hockey right winger.  He played for SKA Leningrad in 1974–1979, then for HC CSKA Moscow from 1979 until part way through the 1986/87 season, when he played again for Leningrad, until 1989.  He finished his career with Borås HC in Sweden, where he played in 1989–1995. He was named most valuable player of the Soviet elite league in 1984. He scored 252 goals in 503 league games and 64 goals in 109 international games with the Soviet national team.

Drozdetsky played on the Soviet national team in 1981, 1982, 1984, and 1985, which won the IIHF World Championships in 1981 and 1982, the Olympic gold medal in 1984, the 1981 Canada Cup, and the 1981, 1982, and 1985 European championships. He was the top goal scorer at the 1984 Olympics with ten goals in seven games, and also led the Soviet team with 12 points.

He died from complications of diabetes.

Career statistics

Regular season and playoffs

International

References

External links
 
 Nikolai Drozdetsky at CCCP International
  Soviet sports legends – Nikolai Drozdetsky

1957 births
1995 deaths
Borås HC players
HC CSKA Moscow players
Ice hockey players at the 1984 Winter Olympics
Olympic gold medalists for the Soviet Union
Olympic ice hockey players of the Soviet Union
People from Kolpino
Russian ice hockey right wingers
SKA Saint Petersburg players
Soviet expatriate ice hockey players
Soviet ice hockey right wingers
Olympic medalists in ice hockey
Medalists at the 1984 Winter Olympics
Deaths from diabetes